Steven Rhoads is an American politician who currently represents New York's 5th State Senate district in the New York State Senate. He was elected in the 2022 New York State Senate election, defeating incumbent Democrat John Brooks, who was redistricted from the 8th district. He is a member of the Republican Party.

Electoral history

References

External links

Living people
New York (state) Republicans
Republican Party New York (state) state senators
21st-century American politicians
Year of birth missing (living people)